The Vatican Railway was opened in 1934 to serve Vatican City and its only station, Vatican City (or  ). Access to the Italian rail network is over a viaduct to Roma San Pietro railway station, and is guaranteed by the Lateran Treaty dating from 1929. The tracks and station were constructed during the reign of Pope Pius XI, shortly after the treaty. 

Beginning in 2015, one passenger service runs each Saturday morning with passengers for Castel Gandolfo.
Most other rail traffic consists of inbound freight goods, although the railway has occasionally carried other passengers, usually for symbolic or ceremonial reasons.

History
Pope Gregory XVI (died 1846) prevented the construction of railways in the Papal States, and was reputed to have said "chemin de fer, chemin d'enfer" ("road of iron, road of hell"). Gregory XVI's successor, Pope Pius IX, began the construction of a rail line from Bologna to Ancona but the territory was seized by the armies of the Kingdom of Sardinia in 1860 before it was completed. The utility of rail travel for the mass pilgrimages of the 19th century, beginning with those at Lourdes circa 1858, was one factor that softened opposition to such technology within the Roman Curia.

The construction of a railway station in Vatican City and its linkage to the Italian rail lines was guaranteed by the Lateran Treaty of 11 February 1929. The Directorate of New Railway Construction of the Ministry of Public Works of the Kingdom of Italy implemented this provision with construction beginning on 3 April 1929, to establish earthworks 38 m above sea level (the height of the "Roma - San Pietro" station) between Piazza Santa Marta and the Governor's Palace, Vatican. The construction of the viaduct leading to Vatican City was paid for by the Italian government; the station within the Vatican was financed from the ₤750 million indemnity agreed to in the Lateran Treaty's financial section. The total cost of construction was reported to be ₤24 million.

The station building (see below) was constructed between 1929 and 1933.

The first locomotive entered the Vatican in March 1932. The station was opened officially on 2 October 1934. A Railway Convention was ratified between Italy and Vatican City on 12 September 1934, on which date the property passed from Ferrovie dello Stato (Italian State Railways) to the Holy See. In October 1934 the Ministry of Public Works gave the completed rail lines to Vatican City and Ferrovie dello Stato, respectively. Legge sulle fonti del diritto (7 June 1929) made Italian railway legislation binding on Vatican-controlled railways.

1940s onwards
In late March 1944, during the allied bombing of Rome in World War II, the Vatican discovered a German munitions train parked on the line by the Vatican railway station. The railway station was the only building in the Vatican to be hit during the Second World War.

Pope John XXIII, on 4 October 1962, became the first pope to use the Vatican railway during his pilgrimage to Loreto and Assisi one week before the beginning of Second Vatican Council using the Italian presidential train; the trip was broadcast on the Eurovision Network. Prior to John's trip in 1962, Pope Pius IX had been both the last pope to visit Loreto (as the head of the Papal States) and the last pope to travel by train. John XXIII also arranged for the major relics of Pope Pius X to be transferred to Venice using the Vatican railway.

Pope John Paul II used the railway a few times for symbolic purposes, as early as 8 November 1979, but did not use the railway to leave Rome until 24 January 2002.

2000s onwards
On 21 May 2011, a special train ran from Vatican City station to commemorate the 60th anniversary of Caritas. Pope Benedict XVI used the railway for a pilgrimage to Assisi on 27 October 2011.

On 18 April 2013, the Turin Group of Train Friends departed on a rail tour from Roma Ostiense railway station to arrive into Vatican City station using two ALn 776 rail cars belonging to Seatrain, which also performed a shunt into the tunnel, then departed with three goods wagons.

Pope Francis's desire to open the Church's treasures to the public has resulted in a weekly special train from Vatican City Station that is open to the public and is provided by the Vatican Museums and the Italian railway. In 2015, this train tour opened to tourists for the first time.

Railway station

The Vatican City railway station (in Italian, Stazione Città del Vaticano or Stazione Vaticana) is the only railway station of the Vatican Railway. Construction began on 3 April 1929, and the station began operation in 1933. Its simple white, Italian marble design was described by writer H. V. Morton as "more like a branch of the Barclay Bank in London." Part of the station building continues in use as passenger station and goods (rail freight) office, whilst part now houses the Vatican numismatic and philatelic museum.

The railway station also houses the small Vatican duty-free department store, a private facility open only to Vatican subjects and diplomats.

Route

The Vatican City State Railway branches off from the Rome to Viterbo railway line at the Roma San Pietro railway station and crosses Gelsomino valley via a 143.12 metre long masonry viaduct of eight 15.30 metre arches (bearing the Fasces and the Savoy Coat of Arms), which crosses Viale Vaticano (which it interrupts) and Via Aurelia. The Via delle Cave and the Via del Gelsomino are also interrupted by the viaduct and thus merge with the Via Aurelia.

The single track section of the route up until the border was subsequently fitted with overhead electric line.  The first 100 metres of overhead line is always supplied with 3000V DC, with the remainder of the distance only energised as needed.

Before passing through the Vatican City walls and terminating in the Vatican City railway station, the line passes under an arch decorated with the Coat of Arms of Pope Pius XI with a two-piece 35.5 ton iron gate which slides into the recesses of the Vatican walls. The gate is closed when there is no traffic scheduled on the line.

The railway has two tracks (partly located in Rome, outside the gateway), but only one is served by a station platform. Two dead-end loading tracks, for freight wagons, are situated on the northwest side of the building. They are connected to the main track that ends in a headshunt in a straight tunnel under the hillside.

The station is near the Vatican Gardens, behind St. Peter's Basilica. Other buildings near the station are the Governatorate Palace and the Domus Sanctae Marthae. The gateway separating the station from rail track in Italian territory is an opening in the Leonine Wall.

Uses

Freight
The Vatican railway has been used primarily for importing goods. Extensive freight operations were witnessed before road transport became more common and less expensive. Although the volume has decreased, there are still regular freight services into the Vatican.

Passengers
There have been intermittent periods of ordinary passenger train operation into the Vatican, but in contemporary use the Vatican City station has only had regularly scheduled passenger service trains since 2015.

A weekly special passenger train operates, provided by the Vatican Museums and the Italian railway. A special train for invited guests and media reporters inaugurated the run on 11 September 2015. This inaugural train was hauled by FS Class 625 steam locomotive 625-017, built in 1915. The same engine was used by the Italian royal family, and also hauled the train which carried Pope John XXIII to Loreto and Assisi in 1962. The regular service has operated every Saturday since 12 September 2015, with visitors to the Vatican Museums boarding a train to travel to the Pontifical Villas in Castel Gandolfo. Scheduled trains use contemporary suburban rolling stock to travel from Vatican City railway station to Albano Laziale, via Castel Gandolfo. At the station visitors can tour the newly created museum and pontifical gardens, and visit the town.

Rolling stock
Pope Pius XI's planned papal train was never constructed, and the Vatican City State has never employed any railway workers or registered any rolling stock. All locomotives, carriages, and wagons (including those which currently convey goods into the Vatican) belong to the Italian Railways (FS).

In 2007, Fiat donated a New Holland Agriculture tractor to the Pope.  The tractor is normally parked at the end of the station platform, where it can be used for shunting duties instead of a locomotive.

Pius IX's official train from the time of the Papal States remains on display at the Museum of Rome, housed in the Palazzo Braschi.

Gallery

See also
Transport in Vatican City
Index of Vatican City-related articles

References

Further reading

 ;  Original: 
 

 "The Vatican Railway, Plan of the Month" by Myles Munsey in 'Continental Modeller', publication by PECO, October 2013, pp 688-693

External links

 Vatican Railway information on www.vatican.va
 Vatican Museums official website
 Vatican Museums official on-line ticket office
 Official English information
 Private Rail Cars of Pope Pius IX

 
Buildings and structures in Vatican City
Railway lines in Lazio 
Vatican 
Transport in Rome 
Railway bridges in Italy